WFDF (910 kHz), which brands itself as 910 AM Superstation, is a commercial AM radio station licensed to Farmington Hills, Michigan, and serving Metro Detroit.  The station is owned and operated by Kevin Adell.  It features local and network talk shows, much of it aimed at the African-American community.  Part of the schedule is brokered programming, where hosts pay for their time and may advertise their products and services during their shows.  Overnight, WFDF carries ESPN Radio.  The studios and offices are on West Ten Mile Road in Southfield, Michigan. 

By day, WFDF is powered at 50,000 watts, the maximum for commercial AM stations.  But to avoid interference to other stations on 910 AM, it reduces power at night to 25,000 watts.  It uses a directional antenna with an eight-tower array.  The transmitter is on Maxwell Road in Carleton, Michigan.  The station broadcasts in HD, and since 2017 broadcasts some shows on Facebook.

History

WEAA and WFDF
Its original call sign was WEAA and it was located in Flint. It made its first broadcast on July 8, 1922. The call letters were changed to WFDF in 1925, in honor of the founder of the station, Frank D. Fallain (1890-1968). WFDF is a Class B station broadcasting on a regional (not clear-channel) frequency.

For many years the station featured a full service, Middle of the Road format of popular adult music, news and sports, targeting Flint. It experimented with a Top 40 rock format (using the nickname "Giant 91") for a time in the early 1970s, but the station shifted its music mix back toward Adult Contemporary by 1975. In the 1980s, as popular music formats on AM were increasingly shifting to FM, WFDF became an Adult Standards station aimed at older demographics.  The format shifted to talk radio in 1993.  By 2001, the station was owned by Cumulus Broadcasting.

Move to Detroit market
In 2002, Cumulus sold the station to ABC, Inc., a subsidiary of Disney.  That August, the station began featuring programming from Radio Disney. In 2003, Disney began preparations to move WFDF to the Detroit radio market.  It announced plans for a new eight-tower array in Monroe County, south of Detroit. Originally, Disney applied to use the new site only for daytime operation with Flint in the northwest corner of the proposed daytime coverage area.  It would continue using the existing transmitter site in Burton, east of Flint, during nighttime hours. (Providing an interference-free nighttime signal to Flint from the Monroe County site, without exceeding the 50,000 watt maximum power limit, would have been practically impossible.)  Shortly after WFDF started broadcasting with this two-site operation, Disney applied to change WFDF's city of license to Farmington Hills, a Detroit suburb, with 50,000 watts of daytime power and 25,000 watts at night, both from the Monroe County site.

For this change to take place, two radio stations operating at AM 900 that would have interfered with a relocated WFDF had to be deleted.  Disney purchased the AM license of WFRO in Fremont, Ohio, while its FM sister station was spun off to a new owner.  In Gaylord, Michigan, WSNQ went silent shortly after its FM station, WMJZ, was spun off to a new owner.  With the two AM 900 stations now silenced, this paved the way for WFDF to substantially increase its power and move into the more profitable Detroit radio market.

The new array still covers Flint with a city-grade signal during daytime hours.  The FCC granted a license for the new facilities in January 2006.  The city of license changed in February 2006.  The former towers in Burton were taken down and dismantled in April 2006.

The station's office is located in Southfield, moving away from Genesee County in the spring of 2006.

Transition and growth
On August 13, 2014, Disney put WFDF and twenty-two other Radio Disney stations up for sale, to focus on digital distribution of the Radio Disney network.

On November 18, Radio Disney Group (the Disney subsidiary that held the license of the station) filed to sell WFDF to Adell Radio Group, Inc., an affiliate of The Word Network, owned by Kevin Adell.  Adell also owns TV station WADL channel 38.

On January 20, 2015, The Word Network closed on the purchase of 910 AM at a price of $3 million and changed the programming to its Christian radio format. The changeover took place with no prior announcement at 5 p.m. on January 20. WFDF was the last Michigan-based Disney O&O broadcast station.

On November 9, 2015, Adell re-launched the station with an "Urban Talk Radio" format.  After purchase of WFDF from Radio Disney, Adell rebranded 910 AM as "the Superstation", with an African American talk radio format.

Programming
WFDF has over 30 on-air show hosts. The station broadcasts 24 hours a day.

In the fall of 2017, the station hired reporters Andre Ash, Detroit News editorial page editor Nolan Finley, and Steve Neavling, editor and publisher of the investigative news site MotorCityMuckraker.com. The station began providing a local news roundup at the beginning of each show, providing on-scene coverage of crime, schools, local government, protests, entertainment, traffic and weather.

On October 5, 2016, morning show host Ralph Godbee walked off the air in the middle of his broadcast because of a dispute. The disagreement was a result of owner Kevin Adell not allowing Godbee to have a show about "Relationships" on Adell's worldwide television network "The Word Network", since Adell intended the Word Network to be religious and believed the content to be inappropriate.

The daytime coverage for 910 AM Superstation includes the metro Detroit area and extends to the northern lower peninsula of Michigan, south to northern Ohio and Indiana, west into the Grand Rapids area, and east into Ontario, Canada.

The nighttime coverage for 910 AM Superstation includes the metro Detroit area and extends north to mid-Michigan and the Thumb area, south to northern Ohio, west to Lansing, and east into Ontario, Canada.

In 2018 the station provided live coverage of the 2018 Detroit Grand Prix on Belle Isle from June 1–3.

Community work
The station attends and participates at public events and rallies, such as live broadcasts during Susan G. Komen's Race for the Cure Detroit and the 2016 Mackinac Policy Conference Detroit Regional Chamber. During the fold out of the Flint Water Crisis, 910 AM hosted a town hall meeting at the University of Michigan-Flint campus. The meeting was aired on 910 AM, WADL, and The Word Network.

In June 2016, the station broadcast every game of the University of Detroit Mercy men's basketball program for the 2016-2017 season. Cliff Russell, one of the station's talk show hosts, was the play-by-play announcer.

See also
 Media in Detroit

References

External links

 The Official 910 AM Superstation website
 WFDF history from The Uncommon Sense
 WFDF sold for 3m USD

FDF
Radio stations established in 1922
Former subsidiaries of The Walt Disney Company
Radio stations licensed before 1923 and still broadcasting
1922 establishments in Michigan